Hoblyn is a surname. Notable people with the surname include:

 John Hoblyn ( 1660–1706), English lawyer
 John Paget Figg-Hoblyn (1926–2011), professor and taxonomist
 Robert Hoblyn (1710–1756), English politician and book collector